Fairfield Union High School is a public high school in Richland Township, Fairfield County, Ohio, located just west of the village of West Rushville, with an enrollment of 645 students. Fairfield Union High School is the only high school in the Fairfield Union Local Schools district, which consolidates three communities: Bremen, Pleasantville, and Rushville. The school's sports teams are known as the Falcons.

Eastland-Fairfield Career & Technical School

References

External links
 

High schools in Fairfield County, Ohio
Public high schools in Ohio